The Island of Doctor Moreau is an 1896 science fiction novel by English author H. G. Wells (1866–1946). The text of the novel is the narration of Edward Prendick, a shipwrecked man rescued by a passing boat. He is left on the island home of Doctor Moreau, a mad scientist who creates human-like hybrid beings from animals via vivisection. The novel deals with a number of themes, including pain and cruelty, moral responsibility, human identity, human interference with nature, and the effects of trauma.  Wells described it as "an exercise in youthful blasphemy."

The Island of Doctor Moreau is a classic work of early science fiction and remains one of Wells's best-known books. The novel is the earliest depiction of the science fiction motif "uplift" in which a more advanced race intervenes in the evolution of an animal species to bring the latter to a higher level of intelligence. It has been adapted to film and other media on many occasions.

Plot
Edward Prendick is an Englishman with a scientific education who survives a shipwreck in the southern Pacific Ocean. A passing ship called Ipecacuanha takes him aboard and a man named Montgomery revives him. Prendick also meets a grotesque bestial native named M'ling who appears to be Montgomery's manservant. The ship is transporting a number of animals which belong to Montgomery, most strangely a puma. As they approach the island which is Montgomery's destination, the captain demands Prendick leave the ship with Montgomery. Montgomery explains that he will not be able to host Prendick on the island. Despite this, the captain leaves Prendick in a dinghy and sails away. Seeing that the captain has abandoned Prendick, Montgomery takes pity and rescues him. As ships rarely pass the island, Prendick will be housed in an outer room of an enclosed compound.

The island belongs to Dr. Moreau. Prendick remembers that he has heard of Moreau, formerly an eminent physiologist in London whose gruesome experiments in vivisection had been publicly exposed, and who fled England as a result of his exposure.

The next day, Moreau begins working on the puma, eventually revealed as being experimented into a woman. Prendick gathers that Moreau is performing a painful experiment on the animal and its anguished cries drive Prendick out into the jungle. While he wanders, he comes upon a group of people who seem human but have an unmistakable resemblance to swine. As he walks back to the enclosure, he suddenly realises he is being followed by a figure in the jungle. He panics and flees, and the figure gives chase. As his pursuer bears down on him, Prendick manages to stun him with a stone and observes that the pursuer is a monstrous hybrid of animal and man. When Prendick returns to the enclosure and questions Montgomery, Montgomery refuses to be open with him. After failing to get an explanation, Prendick finally gives in and takes a sleeping draught.

Prendick awakes the next morning with the previous night's activities fresh in his mind. Seeing that the door to Moreau's operating room has been left unlocked, he walks in to find a humanoid form lying in bandages on the table before he is ejected by a shocked and angry Moreau. He believes that Moreau has been vivisecting humans and that he is the next test subject. He flees into the jungle where he meets an Ape-Man who takes him to a colony of similarly half-human/half-animal creatures including a Sloth-Man. Their leader is a large grey unspecified creature named the Sayer of the Law who has him recite a strange litany called the Law that involves prohibitions against bestial behaviour and praise for Moreau.

	

Suddenly, Dr. Moreau bursts into the colony looking for Prendick, but Prendick escapes to the jungle. He makes for the ocean where he plans to drown himself rather than allow Moreau to experiment on him. Moreau explains that the creatures called the Beast Folk were not formerly men, but rather animals. Prendick returns to the enclosure where Moreau explains that he has been on the island for eleven years and has been striving to make a complete transformation of an animal to a human. He explains that while he is getting closer to perfection, his subjects have a habit of reverting to their animal form and behaviour. Moreau regards the pain he inflicts as insignificant and an unavoidable side effect in the name of his scientific experiments. He also states that pain is an animalistic instinct that one who is truly human cannot have, cutting his thigh with a penknife with no apparent reaction, to further prove his point.

One day, Prendick and Montgomery encounter a half-eaten rabbit. Since eating flesh and tasting blood are strong prohibitions, Dr. Moreau calls an assembly of the Beast Folk and identifies the Leopard-Man (the same one that chased Prendick the first time he wandered into the jungle) as the transgressor. Knowing that he will be sent back to Dr. Moreau's compound for more painful sessions of vivisection, the Leopard-Man flees. Eventually, the group corners him in some undergrowth, but Prendick takes pity and shoots him to spare him from further suffering. Prendick also believes that although the Leopard-Man was seen breaking several laws, such as drinking water bent down like an animal, chasing men (Prendick), and running on all fours, the Leopard-Man was not solely responsible for the deaths of the rabbits. It was also the Hyena-Swine, the next most dangerous Beast Man on the island. Dr. Moreau is furious that Prendick killed the Leopard-Man but can do nothing about the situation.

As time passes, Prendick becomes inured to the grotesqueness of the Beast Folk. However one day, the half-finished puma woman rips free of her restraints and escapes from the lab. Dr. Moreau pursues her, but the two end up fighting each other, leading to their mutual deaths. Montgomery breaks down and decides to share his alcohol with the Beast Folk. Prendick resolves to leave the island, but later hears a commotion outside in which Montgomery, his servant M'ling, and the Sayer of the Law die after a scuffle with the Beast Folk. At the same time, the compound burns down because Prendick has knocked over a lamp. With no chance of saving any of the provisions stored in the enclosure, Prendick realizes that Montgomery has also destroyed the only boats on the island during the night.

Prendick lives with the Beast Folk on the island for months after the deaths of Moreau and Montgomery. As the time goes by, the Beast Folk increasingly revert to their original animal instincts, beginning to hunt the island's rabbits, returning to walking on all fours, and leaving their shared living areas for the wild. They cease to follow Prendick's instructions. Eventually the Hyena-Swine kills Prendick's faithful companion, the Dog-Man created from a St. Bernard. With help from the Sloth Creature, Prendick shoots the Hyena-Swine in self-defence.

Prendick's efforts to build a raft have been unsuccessful. Luckily for him, a lifeboat that carries two corpses drifts onto the beach (perhaps the captain of the ship that picked Prendick up and a sailor). Prendick uses the boat to leave the island and is picked up three days later. When he tells his story, he is thought to be mad. So he feigns amnesia.

Upon his return to England, Prendick is no longer comfortable in the presence of humans, all of whom seem to him to be about to revert to an animal state. He leaves London and lives in near-solitude in the countryside, devoting himself to chemistry and astronomy in the studies of which he finds some peace.

Main characters

Humans
 Edward Prendick – The narrator and protagonist.
 Dr. Moreau – A mad vivisectionist who has fled upon his experiments being exposed and has moved to a remote island in the Pacific Ocean to pursue his research of perfecting his Beast Folk.
 Montgomery – Dr. Moreau's assistant and Prendick's rescuer. A medical doctor who enjoyed a measure of happiness in England, he is an alcoholic who feels some sympathy for the Beast Folk.

Beast Folk
The Beast Folk are animals which Moreau has experimented upon, giving them human traits via vivisection for which the surgery is extremely painful. They include:

 M'ling – Montgomery's servant who does the cooking and cleaning. Moreau combined a bear, a dog, and an ox to create him. As Prendick describes M'ling, he states that M'ling is a "complex trophy of Moreau's skill, a bear, tainted with dog and ox, and one of the most elaborately made of all the creatures". He has glowing eyes and furry ears. M'ling later dies protecting Montgomery from the other Beast Folk on the beach.
 Sayer of the Law – A large, grey-haired animal of unspecified combinations that recites Dr. Moreau's teachings about being men to the other Beast Folk. The Sayer of the Law serves as a governor and a priest to the Beast Folk. He is later killed in an unseen scuffle between Montgomery, M'ling, and the Beast Folk.
 Ape-Man – A monkey or ape creature that considers himself equal to Prendick and refers to himself and Prendick as "Five Men", because they both have five fingers on each hand, which is uncommon among the Beast Folk. He is the first Beast Man other than M'ling to whom Prendick speaks. He has what he refers to as "Big Thinks" which on his return to England, Prendick likens to a priest's sermon at the pulpit.
 Sloth Creature – A small, pink sloth-based creation described by Prendick as resembling a flayed child. He is one of the more relatively benign creatures and helps Prendick kill the Hyena-Swine before fully regressing.
 Hyena-Swine – A carnivorous hybrid of hyena and pig who becomes Prendick's enemy in the wake of Dr. Moreau's death. He is later killed by Prendick in self-defence.
 Leopard-Man – A leopard-based rebel who breaks the Law by running on all fours, drinking from the stream, and chasing Prendick. The Leopard-Man is killed by Prendick to spare him further pain, much to the dismay of Dr. Moreau.
 Ox-Men – A group of gray ox-based creatures who appear twice, first when Prendrick is introduced to the Beast Folk and then again after Montgomery's death.
 Satyr-Man – A hybrid of a goat and an ape. Prendrick describes him as unsettling and "Satanic" in form.
 Swine-Men and Swine-Woman – A group of pig-based Beast Folk who appear during Prendrick's introduction to the Beast Folk.
 Mare-Rhinoceros Creature – A hybrid between a horse and a rhinoceros who appeared during Prendrick's introduction to the Beast Folk.
 Wolf-Men and Wolf-Women – A group of wolf-based Beast Folk who appear during Prendrick's introduction to the Beast Folk.
 Bear-Bull Man - A hybrid of a bear and a cattle who appeared during Pendrick's introduction to the Beast Folk.
 Dog-Man – A Beast Man created from a St. Bernard who, near the end of the book, becomes Prendick's faithful companion. He is so like a domestic dog in character that Prendick is barely surprised when he reverts to a more animalistic form. The Dog-Man is later killed by the Hyena-Swine.
 Fox-Bear Woman – A female hybrid of a fox and a bear who passionately supports the Law. Prendick quickly takes a dislike to her and described her as being evil-smelling.
 Wolf-Bear Man - A hybrid of a wolf and a bear who was mentioned during the hunt for the Leopard-Man as hunting his fellow Beast-Folk a wee-bit too much.
 Half-Finished Puma-Woman – The last beast-person created by Moreau. She is halfway through her process of being turned into one of the Beast Folk, but was in so much pain from the surgery that she uses her strength to break free of her restraints and escape. Moreau then chases after her with a revolver. He and the creature fight each other which ends in a mutual kill.
 Ocelot-Man – One of the smaller creatures which briefly appears after Moreau's death and is shot by Montgomery during his scuffle with the Beast Folk on the beach.

Historical context
At the time of the novel's publication in 1896, there was growing discussion in Europe of the possibility of the  degeneration of the human race. Increasing opposition to animal vivisection led to formation of groups like the National Anti-Vivisection Society in 1875, and the British Union for the Abolition of Vivisection in 1898. The Island of Dr. Moreau reflects the ethical, philosophical, and scientific concerns and controversies raised by these themes and the ideas of Darwinian evolution which were so disrupting to social norms in the late 1800s. In the introduction to the Atlantic Edition, H.G. Wells explained that the book was a reaction to  the trial of Oscar Wilde and a covert condemnation of homophobia influenced by Swift.

Reception
The novel has been criticised as lacking a scientific basis to form the plot of the story. It has almost 5,000 reviews on Goodreads, with an average rating of 3.73 out of 5.

The Island of Doctor Moreau in popular culture

The novel has been adapted to films and other media on multiple occasions. In addition, the novel has influenced many fictional works. The following are some of the works which are related to the character of Dr. Moreau and his story:

In literature
 Maurice Renard's 1908 French novel Le Docteur Lerne, sous-dieu was inspired by The Island of Doctor Moreau, and dedicated to H. G. Wells by its author.
 JLA: Island of Dr. Moreau (2002) is a one-shot tale where Dr. Moreau creates an animal version of the Justice League.  As in the novel they start returning to their animal behavior.
 In Mikhail Bulgakov's novel Heart of a Dog (1925) a Moscow surgeon Dr. Preobrazhensky transplants human organs into the body of homeless dog. As a result, the animal transforms into the man, Poligraf Poligrafovich Sharikov. In the end of the novel Preobrazhensky undergoes another operation to return him to the dog's state.
 The title figure in Argentinian writer Adolfo Bioy Casares novel The Invention of Morel (1940), a scientific genius of questionable morality, alludes to Wells's Moreau.
Moreau's Other Island (1980), by Brian Aldiss, is an updating of the original to a near-future setting. US Under-Secretary of State Calvert Madle Roberts is cast ashore on the eponymous island where he discovers the cyborgised Thalidomide victim Mortimer Dart carrying on Moreau's work. It transpires that Dart's work is intended to produce a 'replacement' race that can survive a post-nuclear environment, and that Roberts approved Dart's funding.
 The Madman's Daughter trilogy (2013), written by Megan Shepherd, tells the story of Dr. Moreau's daughter Juliet. However, each book is based on a different classic novel: the first book is based on this novel by Wells, the second one on Robert Louis Stevenson's Strange Case of Dr Jekyll and Mr Hyde (1886), and the final book is based on Mary Shelley's Frankenstein (1818).
 In chapter 1 of Daniel Pinkwater's novel Lizard Music, Victor watches a late-night film on TV which is identified in chapter 2 as The Island of Dr Morbo.
 In chapter 61 of The Fallen (2013), book five of Charlie Higson's post-apocalyptic horror series, The Enemy, the expedition party from the museum encounters a strange set of malformed children at the biomedical company Promithios, who recite the Litany of the Law.
 The Isles of Dr Moreau (2015), by Heather O'Neill in her short story collection Daydreams of Angels tells of a grandfather who, when he was young, meets an eccentric, albeit humane scientist named Dr Moreau on "the Isle of Noble and Important and Respectable Betterment of Homo sapiens and Their Consorts". Moreau's experiments involve combining animal DNA with human DNA and the story unfolds as the grandfather meets (and dates) several of these humanoid creatures.
 Dr. Franklin's Island (2002), by Ann Halam, is a loose adaptation of the story, in which the eponymous scientist performs transgenic experiments upon the narrator and two other survivors of a plane crash, transforming them into mostly-animal hybrids.
 Sherlock Holmes: The Army of Dr. Moreau (2012), by Guy Adams, puts Sherlock Holmes and Doctor Watson on the trail of several of the hybrids on the loose in London.
 The Strange Case of the Alchemist's Daughter (2017) by Theodora Goss features the half-finished puma woman from The Island of Dr Moreau as one of its main characters, Catherine.
 In Wonder Woman (2016) Chapter 76, Greek goddess Aphrodite is reading a book with the title "The Island of Dr. Moreau"
 In Moon Over Soho (2011), the investigation into the Faceless Man uncovers a deserted sex parlor which the malign wizard's predecessor had operated in the 1970s.  Upon learning that it'd specialized in magically-altered human "chimeras" with animalistic features, Peter nicknames it the "Strip Club of Dr. Moreau".
 The Daughter of Doctor Moreau (2022) by Silvia Moreno-Garcia is a novel billed as "a dreamy reimagining of The Island of Doctor Moreau set against the backdrop of nineteenth-century Mexico."

In music
 The song Toes by the alternative band Glass Animals is based on the book's story.
 The music video for the song Eaten Alive by Diana Ross.
 The song No Spill Blood by Oingo Boingo.
 The song Island of Lost Souls by The Meteors.
 The debut studio album by the American new wave band Devo was titled Q. Are We Not Men? A: We Are Devo! (1978) from a line in the litany of the Law, spoken by the Speaker of the Law to the Beast Folk.
Hip Hop group House of Pain took their name from the novel.
 The sophomore studio album by the nu-metal band Tallah titled The Generation Of Danger (2022) is, as stated by vocalist Justin Bonitz, inspired by the book's story.

In radio
 David Calcutt adapted the story for a BBC Radio 4 Saturday Night Theatre dramatization in 1990, with Kenneth Colley as Montgomery, Garard Green as Moreau, Terry Molloy as M'Ling, Kim Wall as Prentice and Neal Foster as Prentice's Nephew.
 In 2017, Big Finish Productions adapted the story into a two-hour audio drama starring Ronald Pickup as Doctor Moreau with John Heffernan as Edward Prendick and Enzo Cilenti as Montgomery. 
 Jonathan Pryce read a five-part abridgment for Book at Bedtime on BBC Radio 4 in 2008.

In television
 In Orphan Black, a BBC America sci-fi/thriller series, the book plays an important role beginning in the third season. An old copy of the book contains Professor Duncan's cryptic key to human cloning. The fourth season establishes an island similar to Moreau's, called Westmoreau, referred to in the series as simply "The Island of Dr. Moreau." On the island, a Dr. Moreau type figure, P.T. Westmoreland, is the reclusive head of a mysterious and powerful scientific elite who performs experiments on human subjects. Much of the fifth season is set on the island.
 The Simpsons''' annual Halloween special adapted the novel as a segment in their "Treehouse of Horror XIII" episode called "The Island of Dr. Hibbert", in which the doctor invites unsuspecting Springfield residents to his island resort, and turns them into human-animal hybrids including Homer to a walrus, Marge to a panther (in a reference to Lota from the original Island of Lost Souls movie), Lisa to a hawk, Bart to a spider, Maggie to an giant anteater, Mr. Burns to a fox, Waylon Smithers into a flamingo, Chief Wiggum to a pig, Groundskeeper Willie to an orangutan, Ned Flanders to a cow-centaur, and Comic Book Guy to a faun-themed parody of the Sayer of the Law.
 The Canadian cartoon series Spliced is a lighthearted take on the concept. 
 The American animated TV show South Park features a recurring character who seems to be based on the 1996 Brando portrayal of Dr. Moreau, a mad scientist who experiments on animals and is even the president of the North American Marlon Brando Lookalike Association (NAMBLA)
 The Courage the Cowardly Dog episode "Klub Katz" is a spoof on the novel, but the victims are turned into machines instead of animals.
 The Batman: The Animated Series episode "Tyger, Tyger" borrows heavily from the story where a mad scientist named Dr. Emile Dorian (voiced by Joseph Maher) creates the cat-like artificial lifeform Tyger, spliced the DNA of a human and a gorilla to create his henchman Garth, and turns Selina Kyle into an actual cat woman.
 The third-season Sliders episode This Slide of Paradise features an island where a scientist (played by Michael York, co-star of the 1977 film adaptation) has created human-animal hybrids.
 The “Thriller Bark” story arc in the anime series One Piece draws heavily from the novel. It includes a surgeon named Dr. Hogback who disappears from the public eye and begins work on animal-human hybrid zombies as well as several characters who are direct references to the Beast Folk from the novel like Absalom who has the snout of a lion, the skin of an elephant, and the combined muscles of a bear and a gorilla.
 The Johnny Bravo episode "The Island of Mrs. Morceau" features a scientist named Dr. More (voiced by Jennifer Hale) who turns people into animal hybrids where she turns Johnny into a hamster hybrid.
 The episode "Venture Libre" of The Venture Bros. features an island that Dr. Venture visits filled with, among other strange creatures, animal-human hybrids resulting from unethical experiments performed by unscrupulous scientists.
 In The Mighty Boosh episode "Mutants", the zoo animals are mysteriously disappearing, and we discover that Bainbridge and Bob Fossil have been splicing the animals together in a secret lab.
 In the Star Trek: Deep Space Nine episode "The Begotten'", changeling policeman Odo deplores the experimental investigation of his physiology during infancy by his teacher Doctor Mora.
 In the episode "Brainwashed" of "Pinky and the Brain" Snowball guide the protagonists to the lair of Dr. Mordaux.
 In Teenage Mutant Ninja Turtles of 1987, the episode "What's Michelangelo Good For?" the Dr. Lesseau is a scientist to create hybrid.

In cinema
 Ile d'Epouvante (1913, The Island of Terror), a French silent film (also spelled L'Ile d'Epouvante and Isle d'epouvante). The 23-minute, two-reel film, directed by Joe Hamman in 1911 was then released in 1913. By late 1913, the film had been picked up by US distributor George Kleine and renamed The Island of Terror for its release in Chicago.
 Die Insel der Verschollenen (1921), a German silent adaption directed by Urban Gad.
 Island of Lost Souls (1932), with Charles Laughton as Doctor Moreau, and Bela Lugosi as the Sayer of the Law. In the film, Dr. Moreau creates his Beast Folk through "plastic surgery, blood transfusions, gland extracts, and ray baths". In addition, the Sayer of the Law is depicted as a wolf-like humanoid. Another addition is Lota (Kathleen Burke), a woman Moreau derived from a panther, set upon to mate with Edward (Richard Arlen), so Moreau can find out whether or not she can bear human-children. Lota was not a character the original novel (the closest is a half-finished puma woman), but filmmakers of future adaptations apparently loved her so much, they included a love interest in their adaptations, which include Lilia Duran as Selene in Terror Is a Man (1959), Pam Grier as Ayessa in The Twilight People (1972), Barbara Carrera as Maria in the Burt Lancaster version (1977), and Fairuza Balk as Aissa in the Marlon Brando version (1996). 
 Terror Is a Man (1959), with Francis Lederer, Greta Thyssen, and Richard Derr. This Filipino film, directed by Gerardo de Leon, was re-released in the United States years later as Blood Creature. 
 At the age of 13, Tim Burton made an amateur adaptation on Super-8 of Wells' novel as The Island of Doctor Agor (1971).
 The Twilight People (1972), starring John Ashley and with an early role for African-American actress Pam Grier, is Eddie Romero's version of the original story.
 The Island of Dr Moreau, a 1977 film with Burt Lancaster and Michael York. In this film, Dr. Moreau injects the animals with a serum containing human genetic material.
 The Island of Dr. Moreau (1996), a New Line-produced film with Marlon Brando, Val Kilmer, David Thewlis, Fairuza Balk, and Ron Perlman. In this film, Dr. Moreau introduces human DNA into the animals in his possession to make them more human. The film's version of the Sayer of the Law is depicted as a blind goat-like creature. Unlike the books and earlier films, the Sayer of the Law survives the ordeal and sees off the main protagonist.
 The sequel Spy Kids 2: The Island of Lost Dreams (2002), a lunatic scientist named Romero (portrayed by Steve Buscemi) creates miniature hybrid animals on a mysterious island where technology fails to work. Unfortunately, some of them grow upon being discovered to an experimental growth formula, causing Romero to remain in his lab to avoid being eaten. These creations include Spider Monkeys (a half-monkey half-spider creature with a drider-like appearance), Slizards (a lizard with a snake head and neck), Sporks (a pig/stork variation of a flying pig), Turtleroos (a creature with the head and shell of a turtle and the body of a kangaroo), Bullfrogs (a cattle with the hindquarters of a frog), Catfish (a cat with the head and tail of a fish), Horse-Flies (a horse with the head and wings of a house fly), Sheepdogs (a sheep with the head and legs of a bulldog), and Tiger Sharks (a tiger with the head and back fin of a bull shark). After having been briefly captured by Donnagan Giggles, Romero is confronted by his creations who don't eat him as he had feared. The hybrids help thwart Donnagan's plot to use the Transmooker, where the Spork snatches it and a Slizzard eats it.
 The film Dr. Moreau's House of Pain (2004), made by cult horror studio Full Moon Pictures, is billed as a sequel to the novel.
 Christopher Lambert plays Dr. Moreau in the 2018 Italian horror film La Voce del Lupo.

In gaming
 In the 1997 video game Fallout, a grossly mutated human by the moniker of "Master" shares similar characteristics with Doctor Moreau.
 The 2000 video game Metal Slug 3's first mission is an island called "Pallas Island" which was also called "Dr. Moreau's Island" featuring mutated animals albeit as a result of nuclear experimentation.
 Vivisector: Beast Within is a Ukrainian developed first-person shooter game released in the CIS in 2005 and later in the rest of Europe in 2006. The game is heavily inspired by the novel, originally developed as a Duke Nukem title.
 The video game Champions Online features Dr. Phillippe Moreau, the grandson of Dr. Henry Moreau and member of the terrorist organization VIPER (short for Venomous Imperial Party of the Eternal Reptile). Phillippe used his technology to perfect his father's work where he created the Manimals.
 Doctor Merlot, the main villain of the 2016 game RWBY: Grimm Eclipse, is heavily inspired by Doctor Moreau.
 Resident Evil Village features as one of its primary antagonists a mutant named Salvatore Moreau. In-game journal entries describe his experiments on other human subjects with the same parasitic organism that caused his grotesque transformation.
 Dungeons & Dragons has an antagonist named Frantisek Markov who lives on an isle in Ravenloft where he experiments on animals to make them human.
 The 2003 strategy video game Impossible Creatures, centered around creating armies out of animal hybrids, was largely inspired by the novel.

Scientific plausibility

In the short essay "The Limits of Individual Plasticity" (1895), H.G. Wells expounded upon his firm belief that the events depicted in The Island of Doctor Moreau are entirely possible should such vivisective experiments ever be tested outside the confines of science fiction. Until recently, modern medicine has shown that non-human animals lack the necessary brain structure to emulate human faculties like speech. In addition, immune responses to foreign tissues make transplantation within one species very complicated, let alone between species. However, a team of researchers at Stanford University have successfully transplanted a cluster of living human brain cells from a dish in the lab to the brain of a newborn rat to study neurological conditions such as autism, ADHD, and schizophrenia.

References

Further reading
 Canadas, Ivan. "Going Wilde: Prendick, Montgomery and Late-Victorian Homosexuality in The Island of Doctor Moreau." JELL: Journal of the English Language and Literature Association of Korea, 56.3 (June 2010): 461–485.
 Hoad, Neville. “Cosmetic Surgeons of the Social: Darwin, Freud, and Wells and the Limits of Sympathy on The Island of Dr. Moreau”, in: Compassion: The Culture and Politics of an Emotion, Ed. Lauren Berlant. London & New York: Routledge, 2004. 187–217.
 Reed, John R., “The Vanity of Law in The Island of Doctor Moreau”, in: H. G. Wells under Revision: Proceedings of the International H. G. Wells Symposium: London, July 1986, Ed. Patrick Parrinder & Christopher Rolfe. Selinsgrove: Susquehanna UP / London and Toronto: Associated UPs, 1990. 134-44.
 Wells, H. G. The Island of Dr. Moreau, Ed. Steven Palmé. Dover Thrift Editions. New York: Dover Publications, 1996.
 Wells, H. G. The Island of Doctor Moreau: A Critical Text of the 1896 London First Edition, with Introduction and Appendices'', Ed. Leon Stover. The Annotated H.G. Wells, 2. Jefferson, N.C., and London: McFarland, 1996.

External links

 
 
 The Island of Doctor Moreau at Internet Archive (scanned books original editions)
 
 A draft of the 1996 films screenplay, dated 26 April 1994
 
 
 
  Compares the three adaptations of the novel, focuses on the scientists and the science in the film, considering the year of the production and what was known about genes and cells at the time.
 Analysis of The Island of Dr. Moreau on Lit React

 
1896 British novels
British science fiction novels
1896 science fiction novels
Novels by H. G. Wells
Doctor Moreau
Castaways in fiction
Doctor Moreau
Heinemann (publisher) books
Novels adapted into comics
British novels adapted into films
British novels adapted into plays
Experimental medical treatments in fiction
Science fiction novels adapted into films
Moreau, Dr.
Biopunk novels